"Chapter One: The Vanishing of Will Byers" is the premiere episode of the American science fiction horror television series Stranger Things. It was released alongside the rest of the first season on July 15, 2016, on Netflix.

Plot 
In a lab on the outskirts of the fictional town Hawkins, Indiana on November 6, 1983, a scientist is seen attempting to escape from an unseen monster. The monster attacks him in an elevator and kills him.

After a ten-hour Dungeons & Dragons session with his best friends Mike Wheeler (Finn Wolfhard), Lucas Sinclair (Caleb McLaughlin) and Dustin Henderson (Gaten Matarazzo), young Will Byers (Noah Schnapp) rides home near the woods he and his friends nicknamed Mirkwood. Will is startled by the silhouette of a humanoid in the road ahead of him and crashes his bike. He runs through Mirkwood toward his house, while the unseen creature, shown to have telekinetic powers, gives chase. While attempting to arm himself with a shotgun in his family's shed, Will seemingly disappears into thin air.

When Will's mother Joyce (Winona Ryder) and brother Jonathan (Charlie Heaton) realize he's missing the next morning, Joyce goes to the Chief of Police Jim Hopper (David Harbour), a former classmate of hers from high school. Hopper tells her Will has likely run away, perhaps to his absent father, Lonnie. Joyce rebuffs him, believing something sinister has happened, and Hopper begins to search for Will.

Meanwhile, a girl with a shaved head (Millie Bobby Brown) ventures out of the same woods and into a local restaurant, where she steals French fries from the owner, Benny Hammond (Chris Sullivan). He chases her until he realizes she is in trouble and gives her food, as well as calling social services. She doesn't speak, but Benny spots a tattoo on her arm that reads "011" and begins to call the girl "Eleven." When the supposed social service agents arrive, one of them shoots Benny, and Eleven realizes that these people are from the lab. Eleven escapes and runs back into the woods, where she encounters Mike, Dustin, and Lucas, who had set out to search for Will on their own.

Cast and characters 

 Winona Ryder as Joyce Byers
 David Harbour as Jim Hopper
 Finn Wolfhard as Mike Wheeler
 Millie Bobby Brown as Eleven
 Gaten Matarazzo as Dustin Henderson
 Caleb McLaughlin as Lucas Sinclair
 Natalia Dyer as Nancy Wheeler
 Charlie Heaton as Jonathan Byers
 Cara Buono as Karen Wheeler
 Matthew Modine as Martin Brenner
 Noah Schnapp as Will Byers
 Joe Keery as Steve Harrington
 Shannon Purser as Barbara Holland
 Joe Chrest as Ted Wheeler
 Rob Morgan as Officer Powell
 John Paul Reynolds as Officer Callahan
 Mark Steger as The Monster
 Chris Sullivan as Benny Hammond

Production 
The episode was originally titled "Montauk Pilot" and was the first episode from Montauk, the original title for Stranger Things. It was later renamed along with the show, though the script itself barely changed. The episode was written and directed by the show's creators, the Duffer Brothers. "The Vanishing of Will Byers" was released on July 15, 2016, on Netflix.

Reception 
The episode was well received by critics. PopMatters noted that the show "captures fear and the '80s so brilliantly, you'd think Netflix injected it with some mad scientist-created serum to ensure maximum binge-worthiness." Travel Spots also enjoyed the episode.

The Duffer Brothers were nominated for the Primetime Emmy Awards for outstanding writing and outstanding directing for the episode, as well as the Directors Guild of America Outstanding Directorial Achievement for a Drama Series award for "The Vanishing of Will Byers" as well. Others were awarded accolades for their work in the episode as well.

References

External links
 
 

2016 American television episodes
Stranger Things episodes
Television episodes set in the 1980s
Television episodes set in Indiana